Alberto Rizzoli (born 25 June 1993) is an Italian entrepreneur and artificial intelligence (AI) scientist. He is the co-founder and current CEO of V7, a British machine learning software company. Rizzoli is the great-grandson of Italian publisher Angelo Rizzoli.

Early life 
Alberto was born in Rome, Italy. His father Angelo Giorgio Rizzoli was a newspaper publisher and film producer, and his mother Melania De Nichilo Rizzoli is a doctor, politician, and former Member of Parliament.

Alberto founded his first startup at age 19 and was recognized as one of Maker Faire's 20under20.

Career 
In 2015, Rizzoli co-founded Aipoly with Simon Edwardsson. Aipoly developed one of the first engines capable of running large deep neural networks on smartphones. This led to the creation of an app that allowed visually impaired individuals to identify over 5,000 objects using phone cameras. The app scanned 1 billion objects using the processing power of smartphones.

In 2018 he founded V7, an artificial intelligence company specialized in training data software for large-scale AI development. Alberto Rizzoli's vision for V7 is centered around the belief that AI has the potential to reshape industries by serving as a co-pilot to skilled workers whilst learning from their actions at scale.

Awards and recognition 
Alberto received personal audience from Italian President Sergio Mattarella for his contributions to the field of artificial intelligence and accessibility technologies.
He is also an awardee of Italy's Premio Gentile for Science and Innovation.
Alberto Rizzoli and Simon Edwardsson were awarded the Consumer Electronics Show (CES) Best of Innovation Award in both 2017 and 2018 for products developed jointly using artificial intelligence.

References 

1993 births
21st-century Italian businesspeople
Artificial intelligence researchers
Italian computer scientists
Living people